Bizou is a 2007 Canadian Flash animated preschool television series. It teaches children about animals and Aboriginal life through the eyes of an Aboriginal princess named Bizou. Bizou is produced by Jerry Co Animation and 9 Story Entertainment and distributed by Picture Box Distribution. It is shown on Aboriginal Peoples Television Network (aptn) in Canada and First Nations Experience (FNX) in the United States.

Episodes

References

 Jerry Co

External links
 Jerry Co Website
 Picture Box Website

2000s Canadian animated television series
2007 Canadian television series debuts
Canadian flash animated television series
Canadian children's animated comedy television series
Canadian children's animated fantasy television series
Canadian children's animated musical television series
Canadian preschool education television series
Canadian television series with live action and animation
Animated television series about children
Animated television series about bears
Animated television series about fish
Television series about princesses
Aboriginal Peoples Television Network original programming
Animated preschool education television series
2000s preschool education television series
First Nations television series